Louis Townsend (born 3 January 1998) is an Australian swimmer. He competed in the mixed relay at the 2017 FINA World Swimming Championships in Budapest, Hungary. He also competed in the men's 100 metre freestyle event at the 2018 FINA World Swimming Championships (25 m), in Hangzhou, China.

References

External links
 

1998 births
Living people
Australian male breaststroke swimmers
Australian male freestyle swimmers
Place of birth missing (living people)